Shane Book is a Canadian poet. He was a shortlisted nominee for the 2015 Griffin Poetry Prize for his second collection, Congotronic.

Of Trinidadian descent, Book is based in Ottawa. His first poetry collection, Ceiling of Sticks, was published in 2010, and he was a finalist for the CBC Literary Awards in 2011 for "Almost Spain". He obtained his M.F.A. at the Iowa Writers’ Workshop and was a Stegner Fellow at Stanford University.

References

External links 
Biography, poetry excerpts from Griffin Poetry Prize website

21st-century Canadian poets
Canadian male poets
Canadian people of Trinidad and Tobago descent
Black Canadian writers
Writers from Ottawa
Living people
21st-century Canadian male writers
Year of birth missing (living people)